Meridulia zerpana is a species of moth of the family Tortricidae that is endemic to Venezuela.

The ground colour of the forewings is grey, sprinkled and suffused with purple rust and with darker strigulae and dots. The hindwings are dirty cream.

Etymology
The species name refers to its type locality: Mount Zerpa.

References

External links

Moths described in 2006
Endemic fauna of Venezuela
Moths of South America
Euliini
Taxa named by Józef Razowski